The Basketball competitions in the 1981 Summer Universiade were held in Bucharest, Romania.

Men's competition

Final standings

Women's competition

Final standings

External links
https://web.archive.org/web/20100116184925/http://sports123.com/bsk/wun.html
https://web.archive.org/web/20100116184920/http://sports123.com/bsk/mun.html

Basketball
1981 in basketball
1981
International basketball competitions hosted by Romania